The  is a 22.9 km railway line owned by the Ichibata Electric Railway. The line connects Dentetsu-Izumoshi Station in Izumo with Matsue-Shinjiko-Onsen Station in Matsue, all within Shimane Prefecture, Japan. Tracks run parallel to JR West's San'in Main Line on the north of Lake Shinji.

History
The line was first built to transport worshippers between Izumo and Ichibata Yakushi, a shrine to the east of the city. An extension to Matsue was completed in 1928. Before World War II, the line connected directly to Ichibata Yakushi, where a station named Ichibata Station was located nearby. However, during the war, the line was designated as an "unnecessary line", and in 1944 the section between Ichibata and Ichibataguchi Station was closed. This section would later be disassembled in 1960 and parts were offered to the Nagoya Railroad. Because of this, there is still a switchback at Ichibataguchi Station.

Centralized traffic control was introduced to the line in 1966.

Operations
The line is electrified with overhead lines and is single-tracked for the entire line. 

Some services branch off the line at Kawato Station and continue along the Taisha Line to Izumo Taisha-mae Station. There are local, express, and limited express services that run along on the line, along with the Izumotaisha express service and the Superliner limited express.

Stations
All stations are within Shimane Prefecture.

References

Bataden Taisha Line
Railway lines in Japan
Rail transport in Shimane Prefecture
Railway lines opened in 1930